A Paranormal Evening with the Moonflower Society is the ninth studio album by Tobias Sammet's German metal opera project Avantasia. It was released on 21 October 2022, through Nuclear Blast.

Background
According to Avantasia founder Tobias Sammet, song ideas go back as far as 2018 but were not finalized until a few months before the album release. On 19 May 2022, he announced the album for release in Fall 2022. Sammet expressed his content with the album, saying that any song could classify as a first single. The song "The Wicked Rule the Night", along with a lyric video were released the same day. The album title and release date were revealed on 29 June 2022. In a press statement, Sammet explained how his active involvement in arranging, orchestrating and producing the album has made the record feel "extremely personal" to him. In support of the album, the band held six concerts in Germany and Switzerland in Summer 2022.

Track listing

Personnel
Adapted from the album's booklet, Nuclear Blast

Avantasia
 Tobias Sammet – lead vocals, keyboard, bass guitar
 Sascha Paeth – guitar, bass guitar, mixing
 Felix Bohnke – drums

Guest vocalists
 Floor Jansen (Nightwish)
 Jørn Lande (Jorn)
 Michael Kiske (Helloween)
 Bob Catley (Magnum)
 Ralf Scheepers (Primal Fear)
 Geoff Tate (ex-Queensrÿche)
 Ronnie Atkins (Pretty Maids)
 Eric Martin (Mr. Big)

Additional musicians
Michael Rodenberg – keyboard, orchestration on tracks 5, 11
Oliver Hartmann – additional lead guitar on track 4 
Herbie Langhans, Ina Morgan – backing vocals on tracks 1, 3, 6, 7

Charts

Weekly charts

Year-end charts

References

2022 albums
Avantasia albums
Nuclear Blast albums